Heinrich Schmidt (13 December 1902 – 20 December 1960) was a Nazi German politician and mayor of Hildesheim, Germany. He was also a member of the Prussian State Parliament and the Nazi Reichstag.

Life
Schmidt was born in Lehrte, Germany. After attending elementary school he attended the municipal trade school and graduated after a three-year apprenticeship. He worked as a merchant until 1927.

In 1923 Schmidt joined the German People's Party ( or DVP), a liberal political party in the early Weimar Republic. In 1924 he then joined the National Socialist Freedom Party, a front organization of the NSDAP. Schmidt joined the Nazi Party after the ban on it was lifted in the spring of 1925. In 1927, he also joined the Sturmabteilung, the paramilitary arm of the Nazi party. From 1927 to 1932 Schmidt served as Party Kreisleiter in his local district. Schmidt also was a frequent public speaker for the Party in the 1930s.

Schmidt first held public office on the City Council of Hameln from 1929 to 1931. He also served as a member of the Hanoverian provincial Parliament. In the Nazi press, Schmidt worked for the Niedersächsischen Beobachter newspaper from 1927 to 1931 and then from 1932 was a contributor to the magazine Arbeitertum. Between 1932 and 1933, Schmidt served in the Prussian Landtag as a member of the Nazi party for the constituency of South-Hannover. After the dissolution of the Prussian State Parliament in the autumn of 1933, Schmidt was "elected" to the National Reichstag (Nazi Germany) for Constituency 16 (South Hanover-Braunschweig) in November 1933.

After the Nazi Seizure of Power, Schmidt also became a member of the Hanoverian Provincial Committee and a member of various other Boards in the province. On 1 April 1933, Schmidt won the election for the City Council in Hildesheim and on 24 August of that year he took over the Office of Mayor. He disappeared in the fall of 1935 after a defamation case was brought against him. Andreas Dornieden, a political rival, then moved to take over his various seats. Schmidt resigned his Reichstag seat on 28 January 1936. After the war, he returned to Hildesheim. He was sentenced to six years in prison by the local District Court for his activities during the Nazi period. He died in Bredenbeck, Germany in 1960.

References
 Joachim Lilla: Statisten in Uniform. Die Mitglieder des Reichstags 1933–1945 (Düsseldorf: Droste Verlag, 2004) .
Erich Stockhorst: 5000 Heads – Who was Who in the Third Reich (Kiel: Arndt Verlag, 2000) .

External links
Heinrich Schmidt in the Databank of the Reichstag, in German.
Literature by and about Heinrich Schmidt in the catalog of the German National Library.

1902 births
1960 deaths
German nationalists
Nazi Party politicians
National Socialist Freedom Movement politicians
Members of the Reichstag of Nazi Germany
Members of the Reichstag of the Weimar Republic
Mayors of places in Lower Saxony
People from Hanover Region
Sturmabteilung personnel
Nazis convicted of war crimes
People from the Province of Hanover
Criminals from Lower Saxony